Jackie Larue Smith (born February 23, 1940) is an American former professional football player who was a tight end in the National Football League (NFL) for the St. Louis Cardinals and Dallas Cowboys. He played college football at Northwestern Louisiana State College (now Northwestern State University). He was inducted into the Pro Football Hall of Fame in 1994.

Early years
Smith attended Kentwood High School, where he started out playing the clarinet for the school's band. He decided to try out for the football team as a sophomore, but suffered a torn Achilles tendon that forced him to sit out the season. As a junior, he had osteomyelitis in his ankle, so he could only play in the second half of the last game of the season.

As a senior, he was named the starting tailback in the team's single-wing formation, but suffered a serious hip injury in the fourth game and could not play the rest of the way, finishing his high school career after appearing in only 5 games.

He also lettered in track and field, competing in the mile relay, the quarter-mile, the low and high hurdles. He won a state championship in the hurdles.

College career
Northwestern Louisiana State College could only offer him half a scholarship for track, unless he would also agree to play football, so he could qualify for a full scholarship. "They told me, 'If you go out for the football team and don’t quit, we can give you a full scholarship,' " Smith said. "I didn't even have to play—just don't quit."

Smith initially joined the football team to fulfill this provision, but he was good enough to become a starter. During his college career, he had few opportunities to prove his true worth in the Demons' run-oriented offense, leading the team in receiving in his last two years, but recording modest stats. In track, he competed in the hurdles.

In 1980, he was inducted into the Northwestern State Athletics Hall of Fame. In 1983, he was inducted into the Louisiana Sports Hall of Fame.

Professional career

St. Louis Cardinals
Smith was selected by the St. Louis Cardinals in the tenth round (129th overall) of the 1963 NFL Draft, based on the recommendation of Jack Rockwell, then a Cardinals trainer and a part-time scout, who saw him in a spring game during his senior season, where he showed enough speed to stand out. He was a part of a group of 10 rookies that made the team that year.

He was originally projected to play flanker, but was named the starter at tight end after Taz Anderson was injured. In the fifth game of the season against the Pittsburgh Steelers, he posted 212 yards and 2 touchdowns on 9 receptions, while playing a key role in a 24–23 win. He would not relinquish his starter position and would become a team co-captain.

Besides being a talented receiver, Smith displayed elite conditioning and ran with great determination, not only avoiding tacklers but also running through them. He was an excellent blocker, in an era where the tight ends were expected to block more than feature their receiving skills. He was the team starting punter from 1964 to 1966, until Chuck Latourette took over the role.

His best season came in 1967, when in 14 games he registered 56 receptions for 1,295 (third on the league), 21.5 yard-average per reception and 9 touchdowns. Smith proved his durability by playing in 121 straight games, until suffering torn ligaments in the ninth game of the 1971 season.

In 1974 and 1975, he was a part of the NFC East divisional champions. In 1975, although he played in only 9 games, he contributed to the Cardinals setting an NFL record by allowing only 8 sacks in 14 games.

Injuries that included a problem with the arch in one foot and a spinal condition (his arms would go numb after being tackled) affected him in his last two years.

In 1976, he was passed on the depth chart by J. V. Cain and was relegated to a backup role. On December 4, 1977, he announced his retirement after playing 15 seasons and 198 games. In August 1978, it was reported in the media that the Cardinals contacted Smith to return, but no contract was offered.

Smith played in five straight Pro Bowls and posted more than 40 receptions in seven seasons. He is tied for the most seasons played in a Cardinals uniform with 15 and had a string of 45 straight games with at least one reception. Despite his individual accomplishments, the franchise's success proved fleeting, as the Cardinals only made the playoffs twice in Smith's 15 seasons with them, and were eliminated both times in their first round, with Smith catching only one pass in each game.

On January 29, 1994, Smith was officially voted into the Pro Football Hall of Fame in Canton, Ohio, as the third tight end to ever receive this honor and recognized as one of the key players that helped revolutionize the position. In 1994, he was inducted into the Missouri Sports Hall of Fame. In 2001, he was inducted into the St. Louis Walk of Fame. In 2009, he was inducted into the St. Louis Sports Hall of Fame.

Dallas Cowboys
In late September 1978, the Cowboys needed to add depth at tight end after Jay Saldi fractured his arm in the fourth game of the season against the St. Louis Cardinals. Head coach Tom Landry called Smith on Monday, September 25, looking to convince him to come back from retirement and sign with the defending Super Bowl champions on September 28.

He reported to the team on Thursday, September 28, and provided depth against the Washington Redskins three days later. Although he was the oldest player (38 years old) in the Dallas Cowboys roster, not many could keep up with his running ability.

During the regular season, he was used as a blocking tight end in goal-line formations and did not record a start or a reception. He received a game ball for his blocking after a win against the Philadelphia Eagles.

In the NFC divisional playoff game against the Atlanta Falcons, the Cowboys were behind 20–13 in the third quarter and their starting quarterback Roger Staubach was out of the game with a concussion. Backup quarterback Danny White found Smith in the end zone (one of his 3 receptions) to tie the game and contribute to a 27–20 comeback win.

Smith eventually made his only trip to the Super Bowl, which would end up leaving a mark on his career. With the Cowboys trailing the Pittsburgh Steelers 21–14 in the third quarter of Super Bowl XIII, Smith dropped a third-down pass in the end zone from Staubach, so instead of tying the score, the team had to settle for a field goal. Although this wasn't the only critical play or turning point of the game and Staubach has also stated at different times that it was a poorly thrown pass, because it was such an iconic play, Smith was singled out in the media for the 35–31 loss. ESPN ranked Smith's dropped pass in the end zone #24 on their list of "100 Greatest Super Bowl Moments".

Smith retired again, even though the Cowboys still wanted him back for the 1979 season. At the time, Smith's 7,918 career receiving yards were the most ever by an NFL tight end, until he was surpassed by Ozzie Newsome's 7,980 yards in 1990.  His 16.5 yards per catch average is currently the highest among all tight ends in the Hall of Fame.

Personal life
Smith has worked in the marketing of Hobie Cat boats, including pedal kayaks and the Mirage Pro Angler. He has performed the national anthem at different sporting events.

References

External links
Jackie Smith at the Pro Football Hall of Fame
Super Bowl drop doesn't define Jackie Smith's Hall of Fame career

1940 births
Living people
People from Kentwood, Louisiana
Players of American football from Louisiana
American football tight ends
Dallas Cowboys players
Northwestern State Demons football players
St. Louis Cardinals (football) players
Eastern Conference Pro Bowl players
National Conference Pro Bowl players
Pro Football Hall of Fame inductees